Simon Bingelhelm (1565 – June 2, 1600), called The Thousand Devil of Halberstadt, was a German robber and serial killer. He was executed for multiple crimes in an area now known as Saxony-Anhalt.

Capture 
In the spring of 1600, a man who was believed to be the "Thousand Devils of Halberstadt." was arrested. He was brought to Gröningen, the location of the Diocese of Halberstadt at the time, and which was the residence of Duke Henry Julius of Brunswick. There, the suspect was imprisoned and interrogated, sometimes under torture.

Confessions 
In the course of the interrogations, the man stated that his civil name was Simon Bingelhelm, and that he was born in Halberstadt.

He confessed to numerous burglaries and theft offenses, primarily in Halberstadt, but also in Wernigerode, Reddeber, Falkenstein, Hoym, Aschersleben, Seehausen, Ballenstedt, Eilenstedt, Heimburg, Klein Quenstedt, Westerhausen, Dardesheim, Prenzlau, Salzwedel, Haldensleben, Neuhaldensleben, Calvörde, Derenburg, Herzberg, Oschersleben, Schermcke, Krottorf and Quedlinburg.

He allegedly said that he was the arsonist behind the fire at Drübeck Abbey monastery in 1599, and that he watched the fire from a neighboring mountain. He had a chalice from Rade church and had stolen eleven talers from the poverty box of St. George's Church in Derenburg. He broke into the Martinique Church with others, and stole the poor box. In Helmstedt, he stabbed a man for two groschen and a pawn near Bernburg. At Benzingerode he killed a young woman, eight days before the Pentecost in 1599. In the forest between Hornburg and Osterwieck, he tried to rape an 18-year-old girl and later killed her.

In the interrogations, the man confessed to a total of 71 crimes, including involvement in 26 murders. Among other things, he is said to have attacked a pregnant woman, whom he killed with his cronies. They supposedly slashed her body to remove her unborn child, from whose entrails he then made candles for his next burglary. He was involved in the robbery and killing of at least five infants.

During the interrogation, this was recorded:

Execution 
On his execution on June 2, 1600, in Gröningen, he was: "attacked with pincers for honor, dragged to the town court, then quartered."

See also
 List of German serial killers

References 

1500s births
1600 deaths
16th-century executions in the Holy Roman Empire
Executed German serial killers
Male serial killers
People executed by dismemberment